Siskan (also Romanized as Siskān and Sīsgān; also known as Sīgān) is a village in Kahshang Rural District, in the Central District of Birjand County, South Khorasan Province, Iran. At the 2016 census, its population was 142, in 48 families.

References 

Populated places in Birjand County